Pacific Standard Time: LA/LA is an art event celebrating Latin American art in over 70 museums and galleries in Los Angeles and Southern California held from September 2017 through early 2018.

See also 

 Pacific Standard Time: Art in L.A., 1945–1980

Further reading 

 
 
 
 
 
 
 
 
 
 
 
 
 
 
 
 
 
 
 
 
 
 
 
 
 

Earlier editions
 
 

Latin American art
Art in Greater Los Angeles
Art exhibitions in the United States
2017 in Los Angeles
2018 in Los Angeles